Ivins is a city in southwestern Washington County, Utah, United States. It is a part of the St. George Metropolitan Area as a suburb or "bedroom" community. The population was 8,978 at the 2020 census, up from 6,753 at the 2010 census.  Although Ivins was listed as a town in the 2000 census, it became a city in 1998.

Geography

Ivins is near Tuacahn (an outdoor arts and amphitheater) and Snow Canyon State Park, which draw many people to the area. There are many new planned developments (some with golf courses) near or in Ivins, joining the earlier Kayenta and Padre Canyon developments.

Climate
According to the Köppen Climate Classification system, Ivins has a semi-arid climate, abbreviated "BSk" on climate maps.

Demographics

As of the census of 2000, there were 4,450 people, 1,435 households, and 1,234 families residing in the town. The population density was 436.3 people per square mile (168.4/km2). There were 1,598 housing units at an average density of 156.7 per square mile (60.5/km2). The racial makeup of the town was 93.96% White, 0.07% African American, 1.19% Native American, 0.34% Asian, 0.34% Pacific Islander, 2.04% from other races, and 2.07% from two or more races. Hispanic or Latino of any race were 3.93% of the population.

There were 1,435 households, out of which 43.8% had children under the age of 18 living with them, 76.0% were married couples living together, 7.6% had a female householder with no husband present, and 14.0% were non-families. 11.0% of all households were made up of individuals, and 4.6% had someone living alone who was 65 years of age or older. The average household size was 3.10 and the average family size was 3.35.

In the town the population was spread out, with 33.1% under the age of 18, 9.0% from 18 to 24, 25.5% from 25 to 44, 20.1% from 45 to 64, and 12.3% who were 65 years of age or older. The median age was 30 years. For every 100 females, there were 98.7 males. For every 100 females age 18 and over, there were 95.9 males.

The median income for a household in the town was $41,297, and the median income for a family was $43,103. Males had a median income of $30,868 versus $21,719 for females. The per capita income for the town was $16,743. About 4.9% of families and 6.8% of the population were below the poverty line, including 9.8% of those under age 18 and 3.4% of those age 65 or over.

Arts and culture

Within the Kayenta Desert Community, there is the Kayenta Art Village, which is a unique collection of art galleries, a small theater, and a cafe/restaurant. Nearby there is a labyrinth made from small stones called the Desert Rose.

The Tuacahn Center for the Arts in Ivins City is the largest professional outdoor theater in Utah employing between 100 to 250 people. It includes a 1,920-seat outdoor amphitheater, a 328-seat indoor theater, and other supporting facilities including a gift shop and restaurant. Each year it draws spectators to two to three major musical performances that are presented every week at the outdoor amphitheater throughout the summer months while also providing additional shows in the smaller indoor theater. In the offseason, the Tuacahn amphitheater is a concert venue for popular singers, bands, and comedians. Tuacahn also recently constructed vacation rentals on-site called Canyon Suites at Tuacahn. During the show season this facility provides housing to the professional performers that are cast and imported from abroad.

Fire Lake Park at Ivins Reservoir has become a popular beach and swim destination since it was created in 2018. The west bay of Ivins Reservoir was segmented off from the rest of the reservoir with a small dam and sand was imported to create an always full swim area and pleasant beach complete with picnic tables, trails, and restrooms.

The Red Mountain Resort and Movara Resort are two spas located in Ivins City. Under development next to Tuacahn is the 10-acre Sentierre Resort. Black Desert Resort is currently under development.

Education
Various schools service the local population, public and charter, as well as a private School of medicine. All of the public schools are within Washington County School District, with all competitive athletics and activities of the region competing in Region 10 of the UHSAA.

Elementary
Red Mountain Elementary School (K-5 grades)
Vista School (K-9 grades, Art and Technology focused Charter School)

Secondary
Lava Ridge Intermediate School (6-7 grades in nearby Santa Clara, Utah)
Snow Canyon Middle School (8-9 grades in St. George, Utah)
Snow Canyon High School (10-12 grades, St. George)

Higher education
Rocky Vista University College of Osteopathic Medicine

See also

 Snow Canyon State Park - a nearby park
 Tuacahn High School for the Arts (A recently shuttered school in Ivins)

References

External links

 

Cities in Utah
Cities in Washington County, Utah
Populated places established in 1922
1922 establishments in Utah